The 2014 U.S. Open Grand Prix Gold was the eighth grand prix gold and grand prix tournament of the 2014 BWF Grand Prix Gold and Grand Prix. The tournament was held in Suffolk County Community College, New York, United States July 8 until July 13, 2014 and had a total purse of $120,000.

Players by nation

Men's singles

Seeds

  Nguyen Tien Minh (champion)
  Chou Tien-chen (final)
  Eric Pang (third round)
  Brice Leverdez (withdrew)
  Anand Pawar (quarter-final)
  Wong Wing Ki (semi-final)
  Wang Tzu-wei (third round)
  Pablo Abian (withdrew)
  Suppanyu Avihingsanon (quarter-final)
  Misha Zilberman (second round)
  Emil Holst (second round)
  Joachim Persson (second round)
  Arvind Bhat (second round)
  Sattawat Pongnairat (third round)
  Rasmus Fladberg (third round)
  Petr Koukal (third round)

Finals

Top half

Section 1

Section 2

Section 3

Section 4

Bottom half

Section 5

Section 6

Section 7

Section 8

Women's singles

Seeds

  Nichaon Jindapon (first round)
  Michelle Li (quarter-final)
  Zhang Beiwen (champion)
  Beatriz Corrales (second round)
  Linda Zechiri (quarter-final)
  Chloe Magee (first round)
  Karin Schnaase (first round)
  Natalia Perminova (second round)

Finals

Top half

Section 1

Section 2

Bottom half

Section 3

Section 4

Men's doubles

Seeds

  Mathias Boe / Carsten Mogensen (final)
  Maneepong Jongjit / Nipitphon Puangpuapech (champion)
  Baptiste Careme / Ronan Labar (quarter-final)
  Phillip Chew / Sattawat Pongnairat (quarter-final)

Finals

Top half

Section 1

Section 2

Bottom half

Section 3

Section 4

Women's doubles

Seeds

  Eva Lee / Paula Lynn Obanana (second round)
  Anastasia Chervaykova / Nina Vislova (semi-final)
  Puttita Supajirakul / Sapsiree Taerattanachai (final)
  Nicole Grether / Charmaine Reid (second round)

Finals

Top half

Section 1

Section 2

Bottom half

Section 3

Section 4

Mixed doubles

Seeds

  Maneepong Jongjit / Sapsiree Taerattanachai (final)
  Vitalij Durkin / Nina Vislova (semi-final)
  Jorrit de Ruiter / Samantha Barning (quarter-final)
  Max Schwenger / Carla Nelte (quarter-final)

Finals

Top half

Section 1

Section 2

Bottom half

Section 3

Section 4

References

U.S. Open Badminton Championships
U.S. Open Grand Prix Gold
BWF Grand Prix Gold and Grand Prix
U.S. Open Grand Prix
U.S. Open Grand Prix
U.S. Open Grand Prix